A hooligan is a participant in hooliganism—unruly, destructive, or bullying behaviour.

Hooligan(s) may also refer to:

Hooliganism
Football hooliganism, among fans of association football clubs
Motorcycle hooliganism, among motorcycle riders

Music

Performers
Hooligan (rapper) (born 1980), Maltese rapper
The Hooligans, Bruno Mars's band

Albums
Hooligans (album), by the Who, 1981
Hooligan, by Adam Calhoun and Upchurch, 2019

Songs
"Hooligan" (song), by Embrace, 1999
"Hooligan", by Baby Keem, 2020
"Hooligan", by the Heart Throbs, 1992
"Hooligan", by Kiss from Love Gun, 1977
"Hooligans" (song), by Don Diablo and Example, 2009
"Hooligans", by Rancid from Life Won't Wait, 1998
"Hooligans", from the Dad's Army stage show, performed by Bill Pertwee, 1975

Other arts and entertainment
Hooligan (wrestler) (born 1972), or Luciferno, Mexican masked professional wrestler
The Hooligan, a 1911 play by W. S. Gilbert
Hooligans (film), or Green Street, a 2005 British film
Hooligans: Storm Over Europe, a 2002 computer game
Hooligans, a 1984 novel by William Diehl

Other uses
Hooligan (fish), or eulachon, a species of smelt
Hooligan (sternwheeler), an early-20th century steamboat in Oregon, U.S.
Halligan bar or "hooligan tool", a forcible entry tool